Joshua Alexander Guyer (born 27 May 1994) is an Australian professional baseball pitcher for the Sydney Blue Sox of the Australian Baseball League.

Career
He was signed as a non drafted free agent by the Minnesota Twins on 26 July 2012 and played in the Twins farm system until he was released in 2015.

Guyer was selected as a member of the Australia national baseball team for the 2017 World Baseball Classic, 2019 Canberra camp,  2019 WBSC Premier12 and the 2023 World Baseball Classic.

References

External links

Australian baseball bio

1994 births
Living people
Australian expatriate baseball players in the United States
Baseball pitchers
Elizabethton Twins players
Gulf Coast Twins players
People from Tamworth, New South Wales
Sportsmen from New South Wales
Sydney Blue Sox players
2017 World Baseball Classic players
2023 World Baseball Classic players